Sorority House Massacre III: Hard to Die (also known as Tower of Terror or simply Hard to Die) is a 1990 American slasher film written by Mark Thomas McGee and James B. Rogers, directed by Jim Wynorski, and starring Gail Harris and Melissa Moore. The film features a similar storyline and many of the same actresses from its predecessor, and Wynorski's previous film Sorority House Massacre II, of which Hard to Die is essentially a remake.

The film was released direct-to-video in 1990, but it was released theatrically in 1992 under the name Tower of Terror and received an NC-17 rating. A sequel, titled Sorority House Massacre: The Final Exam, wrapped production in February 2002, but remains an unreleased film as of December 2022.

Production
Jim Wynorski had made the previous film for Julie Corman called Sorority House Massacre II. Corman's husband Roger wanted Wynorski to remake it, using the same story and cast. Wynorski says: "When Roger Corman saw what I did for his wife in just seven days, he wanted me to do the same for him".

Corman wanted to re-use the sets which had just been used for Corporate Affairs (1990), which consisted of a reception area and a few suites. According to Mark Thomas McGee, who was hired to work on the script:

This change in locale presented Jim and I with a problem—how to get the women out of their clothes and into their underwear. Try to imagine someone like David Lean or William Wyler wrestling with a dilemma like this. Not that women would ever run around in their under- wear regardless of the location, but it was a little easier to swallow when they were in a sorority house. I asked Jim if it would be too much of a problem to redress the reception area to make it seem like we're on different levels of a high rise instead of a single level office. Jim liked that idea because it opened up all sorts of possibilities for us. It not only gave the ladies more room to run and hide from the killer, it also meant (and this was the genius of the stroke) that they could discover a lingerie company on another level. The sequence where these ladies become so excited when they discover these frilly and sexy undergarments (and just can't wait to try them on) is as ridiculous and infantile as anything you can imagine. But half-naked women is just about all that a film like this has to offer.

McGee says he had a week to write a script. He spent five days going in a different direction, but then realised Corman genuinely wanted a true remake, and spent two days redrafting.

Wynorski says with the film: "I took Orville's hardships to even further extremes".

The film is alternatively known as Tower of Terror.

Plot
A group of women are about to experience the most horrifying night of their lives - trapped in a deserted skyscraper, with a crazed killer at their heels. Soon, their innocent overtime duty becomes an action-filled evening of terror and suspense - yet they choose to defy the odds and fight back ... trading fear for firepower in a high-stakes, all-out fight to the death.

Cast
Gail Harris as Linda Dawn Grant (as Robyn Harris)
Karen Mayo-Chandler as Diana (as Lindsay Taylor)
Deborah Dutch as Jackie Cassidy (as Debra Dare)
Melissa Moore as Jessica 'Tess'
Bridget Carney as Candy Shayne
Toni Naples as Sergeant Phyllis Shawlee (credited as Karen Chorak)
Jürgen Baum as Lieutenant Mike Block
Bob Sheridan as Cop In Lobby
Carolet Girard as Fifi Latour
Peter Spellos as Orville Ketchum
Don Key as Brad Plympton
Forrest J Ackerman as Dr. Ed Newton
James B. Rogers as Messenger (as J.B. Rogers)
Domonic Muir as Larry Bronkowski
Eric Baum as Agent
Amelia Sheridan as Helga
Don Peterson as Husband
Kelli Maroney as Wife (as D. Mason Keener)
Greg Lauoi as Cameraman
Cirsten Weldon as Agent's Girlfriend
Monique Gabrielle as CD Girl (as Lucy Burnett)
Ronald V. Borst as Pedestrian
Jim Wynorski as Director (uncredited)

Unreleased sequel
A fourth Sorority House Massacre film began production in 2001 and wrapped principal photography in February 2002. The film had changed the name to Final Exam in August. The film was scheduled for release in 2007 on DVD under another new title The Legacy, but Roger Corman's Concorde Pictures closed up shop and the film was never released. In March 2015, Jim Wynorski released a poster for the film on his official Facebook page with the title Sorority House Massacre: The Final Exam. As of December 2022, it is unknown as to whether or not the film will ever be released. Sam Phillips, who portrayed a fictionalised version of herself in the film, reprised her role in Cheerleader Massacre, a direct sequel to The Slumber Party Massacre.

References

External links

1990 films
1990s English-language films
1990s comedy horror films
Films directed by Jim Wynorski
Girls with guns films
American comedy horror films
Massacre (franchise)
1990 comedy films
1990s American films